Tina Pupuke-Browne (born 4 April 1955) is a Cook Islands politician and a member of the Cook Islands Parliament. She is the leader of the Democratic Party.

Career
Brown was born in 1955 and is from the island of Rakahanga and is the daughter of former Cook Islands Prime Minister Pupuke Robati. She was educated at Tereora College and then attended the University of Canterbury in Christchurch, New Zealand, graduating with a Bachelor of Laws in 1979 – the first woman from Rarotonga to do so. She subsequently worked for New Zealand law firm Russell McVeagh. She returned to the Cook Islands in 1981 to work for the Crown Law Office before entering private practice. She served as president of the Cook Islands Netball Association.

Browne first entered politics in 1996, when she contested the Nikao-Panama by-election as a candidate for the Cook Islands Party. She was defeated by Ngamau Munokoa.

She was elected as leader of the Democratic Party in April 2017, replacing William (Smiley) Heather. In the 2018 election she contested the seat of Rakahanga, losing to the Cook Islands Party's Toka Hagai. Hagai subsequently resigned the seat following allegations of treating, and Browne won it following an electoral petition.

In December 2019 she was part of a protest by women MPs to permit the wearing of ei katu (floral crowns) in Parliament.

In April 2020 she led several MPs in taking a pay cut during the COVID-19 pandemic. During 2020 she supported the government's efforts to prevent the spread of covid to the Cook Islands, and later opposed the government's lifting of quarantine.

In March 2021 she joined the government in opposing a 10-year moratorium on seabed mining.

She was re-elected at the 2022 Cook Islands general election.

References

1955 births
Living people
People from Aitutaki
University of Canterbury alumni
Members of the Parliament of the Cook Islands
Democratic Party (Cook Islands) politicians
Cook Island women in politics
21st-century New Zealand women politicians
21st-century New Zealand politicians
Cook Island lawyers
Women lawyers